Karim Guerfi (born 8 March 1987) is a French professional boxer who has held the European featherweight title since August 2021 and previously held the European bantamweight title three times between 2013 and March 2021. He has also challenged for the WBA interim flyweight title in 2012 and the IBO bantamweight title in 2018.

Professional career
On December 10th 2022 knocked out by Micheal Conlan in round 1
On 11 May 2012, Guerfi fought Juan Carlos Reveco for the interim WBA Flyweight title, but lost by unanimous decision.

On 28 September 2013, Guerfi defeated Stephane Jamoye by majority decision to win the EBU Bantamweight title.

On December 10th, Guerfi was defeated in the 1st round by Michael Conlon..A great competitor but fell short of the required standard

Professional boxing record

References

External links
 

1987 births
Living people
Light-flyweight boxers
Flyweight boxers
Bantamweight boxers
Super-bantamweight boxers
European Boxing Union champions
French male boxers
People from Manosque
Sportspeople from Alpes-de-Haute-Provence